The Kazimzumbwi Forest Reserve is a forest reserve in Pwani Region, Tanzania. The reserve was established in 1936, but both agriculture and logging were tolerated for several years. Logging, in particular, went on until the 1970s.

The Kazimzubwi Forest and the adjacent Pugu Forest Reserve are reportedly the remainders of one of the oldest surviving forests in the world.

References

 Official site of the Pugu and Kazimzumbwi Reserves
 Pugu and Kazimzumbwi Forest Reserve

Nature reserves in Tanzania
Geography of Pwani Region
Forest reserves of Tanzania